The wedding of Prince Philippe, Duke of Brabant, and Mathilde d'Udekem d'Acoz took place on 4 December 1999 in Brussels, Belgium. The civil proceedings were conducted at Brussels Town Hall while the religious ceremony took place at the Cathedral of St. Michael and St. Gudula. The wedding has been described as the social event of the decade within Belgium and it was the last royal wedding of the second millennium.

The bride and groom
Philippe, then Duke of Brabant, is the eldest son of King Albert II and Queen Paola. Mathilde d'Udekem d'Acoz is a descendant of Belgian and Polish nobility. After the wedding, Mathilde became the duchess of Brabant and a princess of Belgium on 8 November 1999 (published on 13 November 1999 and effective from 4 December 1999). In 2013, Philippe and Mathilde became the king and queen of the Belgians. Mathilde is the first Belgian born queen in the country's history.

Wedding events

The first of the day's main events took place in the Gothic setting of Brussels Town Hall where Philippe and Mathilde contracted a civil marriage in the French, Dutch and German languages. Mathilde's bridal gown was designed by Edouard Vermeulen. Philippe wore the uniform of a Belgian Air Force colonel. Thereafter the couple traveled to the nearby Cathedral of St. Michael and St. Gudula to marry according to the rites of the Roman Catholic Church. An evening reception took place in the Palace of Laeken, a royal residence.

Popular reactions and effects
The run up to the wedding was said to have led to widespread feelings of positive sentiment in Belgium, with the potential for greater unity between the country's Dutch-speaking north and French-speaking south. Around 50,000 people lined the streets of Brussels on the occasion of Philippe and Mathilde's wedding. As many as 200,000 people had been expected but the lower numbers were perhaps on account of the bitterly cold weather on the day. After the wedding, some popular culture academics commented that the wedding had had a unifying effect on the Belgian people as well as marking a new phase of positivity in the country. The BBC, however, reported that academics and political commentators in Belgium deemed that the national rift was too great for the wedding to have much effect.

Guests

The groom's family

Belgian royal family
 The King and Queen of the Belgians, the groom's parents
 The Archduchess and Archduke of Austria-Este, the groom's sister and brother-in-law
 Prince Amedeo of Belgium, Archduke of Austria-Este, the groom's nephew
 Princess Maria Laura of Belgium, Archduchess of Austria-Este, the groom's niece
 Prince Joachim of Belgium, Archduke of Austria-Este, the groom's nephew
 Princess Luisa Maria of Belgium, Archduchess of Austria-Este, the groom's niece 
 Prince Laurent of Belgium, the groom's brother
 The Princess of Réthy, the groom's paternal step-grandmother
 Queen Fabiola of Belgium, the groom's paternal aunt by marriage 
 Prince Alexandre and Princess Léa of Belgium, the groom's paternal half-uncle and aunt
 Princess Marie-Esméralda, Mrs Moncada and Dr Salvador Moncada, the groom's paternal half-aunt and uncle

Ruffo family
 Prince Fabrizio and Donna Luisa Ruffo di Calabria
 Prince Fulco and Princess Melba Ruffo di Calabria
 Prince Augusto Ruffo di Calabria 
 Princess Irma Ruffo di Calabria
 Prince Alessandro Ruffo di Calabria
 Don Antonello and Donna Rosa Maria Ruffo di Calabria
 Don Lucio Ruffo di Calabria
 Donna Claudia Ruffo di Calabria
 Flavia Porcari Li Destri
 Donna Marielli Ruffo di Calabria

The bride's family
 Count Patrick and Countess Anna Maria d’Udekem d’Acoz, the bride's parents
 Countess Elisabeth d’Udekem d’Acoz, the bride's sister
 Countess Hélène d’Udekem d’Acoz, the bride's sister
 Count Charles-Henri d’Udekem d’Acoz, the bride's brother
 Count Henri d’Udekem d’Acoz
 Count Raoul and Countess Francoise d’Udekem d’Acoz
 Countess Gabrielle Komorowski
 Countess Rose Komorowski and Jean-Michel Maus de Rolley
 Count Michel and Countess Dominique Komorowski
 Countess Christine Komorowski and Alain de Brabant
 Countess Marie Komorowski and Gérard Braun
 Prince Alexandre Sapieha
 Prince Stefan Sapieha

Foreign royalty

Members of reigning families
 The Queen and Prince Consort of Denmark, the groom's second cousin once removed, and her husband
 The Crown Prince and Crown Princess of Japan (representing the Emperor of Japan)
 Princess Rahma bint el-Hassan of Jordan (representing the King of Jordan)
 The Prince and Princess Liechtenstein, the groom's third cousin once removed, and his wife
 Prince Wenzeslaus of Liechtenstein, the groom's fourth cousin
 Prince Nikolaus and Princess Margaretha of Liechtenstein, the groom's first cousin and her husband
 Princess Marie-Astrid of Liechtenstein, the groom's first cousin once removed
 The Grand Duke and Grand Duchess of Luxembourg, the groom's paternal uncle and aunt
 The Hereditary Grand Duke and Hereditary Grand Duchess of Luxembourg, the groom's first cousin and his wife
 Prince Jean of Luxembourg, the groom's first cousin
 Prince Guillaume of Luxembourg, the groom's first cousin
 The Hereditary Prince of Monaco (representing the Prince of Monaco)
 Princess Lalla Sumaya of Morocco (representing the King of Morocco)
 Princess Lalla Hasna of Morocco
 The Crown Prince of Nepal (representing the King of Nepal)
 The Queen of the Netherlands, the groom's fourth cousin twice removed
 The Prince of Orange, the groom's fifth cousin once removed
 Prince Constantijn of the Netherlands, the groom's fifth cousin once removed
 The King and Queen of Norway, the groom's first cousin once removed, and his wife
 The Crown Prince of Norway, the groom's second cousin
 Princess Märtha Louise of Norway, the groom's second cousin
 The Queen of Spain, the groom's third cousin once removed (representing the King of Spain)
 The Prince of Asturias, the groom's fourth cousin
 The King and Queen of Sweden, the groom's third cousin and his wife
 The Prince of Wales, the groom's third cousin once removed (representing the Queen of the United Kingdom)

Members of non-reigning families
 Archduke Carl Ludwig of Austria, the groom's second cousin, twice removed
 Archduke Carl Christian and Archduchess Marie Astrid of Austria, the groom's third cousin once removed and the groom's first cousin
 Archduke Simeon and Archduchess María of Austria, the groom's third cousin once removed, and the groom's fourth cousin once removed
 Archduke Karl Peter and Archduchess Alexandra of Austria, the groom's third cousin once removed, and his wife
 The Dowager Archduchess of Austria-Este, the groom's fourth cousin once removed
 Archduke Gerhard of Austria-Este, the groom's fifth cousin
 Archduke Martin of Austria-Este, the groom's fifth cousin
 The Duke of Bavaria, the groom's second cousin once removed
 The Duke and Duchess in Bavaria, the groom's second cousin once removed, and his wife
  Duchess Helene in Bavaria, the groom's third cousin
 The Prince and Princess of Turnovo, the groom's fourth cousin once removed
 The Duke of Vendôme, the groom's fourth cousin once removed
 The Duke and Duchess of Angoulême, the groom's fourth cousin, once removed and his wife
 The Princess Napoléon, widow of the groom's second cousin twice removed
 Prince Jérôme Napoléon, the groom's third cousin once removed
 King Constantine II and Queen Anne-Marie of the Hellenes, the groom's third cousin once removed, and the groom's second cousin once removed
 The Prince and Princess of Naples, the groom's first cousin once removed, and his wife
 Princess Maria Gabriella of Savoy, the groom's first cousin once removed
 The Duke of Braganza, the groom's second cousin twice removed
 King Michael I and Queen Anne of Romania, the groom's third cousin once removed, and the groom's second cousin twice removed
 Prince Dimitri of Yugoslavia, the groom's second cousin

Other notable guests
 The President of the Republic of Poland and Mrs Kwaśniewska

External links
YouTube - Belgium: Crown Prince Philippe Wedding

References

Belgium
1999 in Belgium
Events in Brussels
Belgian monarchy
December 1999 events in Europe
Belgium
1990s in Brussels